Mniodes is a genus of South American flowering plants in the tribe Gnaphalieae within the family Asteraceae.

 Species
The following species are recognised in the genus Mniodes:
 Mniodes andina (A.Gray) Cuatrec - Peru (Ancash, Arequipa, Cajamarca)
 Mniodes aretioides (Wedd.) Cuatrec. - Bolivia, Peru (Puno, Cuzco)
 Mniodes argentea (Wedd.) M.O.Dillon
 Mniodes burkartii (Cabrera) S.E.Freire, Chemisquy, Anderb. & Urtubey
 Mniodes catamarcensis (Cabrera) S.E.Freire, Chemisquy, Anderb. & Urtubey
 Mniodes coarctata Cuatrec. - Peru (Arequipa, Cuzco, Ayacucho), Chile (Tarapacá)
 Mniodes longifolia (Cuatrec. & Aristeg.) S.E.Freire, Chemisquy, Anderb. & Urtubey
 Mniodes lopezmirandae (Cabrera) S.E.Freire, Chemisquy, Anderb. & Urtubey
 Mniodes pickeringii (A.Gray) S.E.Freire, Chemisquy, Anderb. & Urtubey
 Mniodes piptolepis (Wedd.) S.E.Freire, Chemisquy, Anderb. & Urtubey
 Mniodes plicatifolia (Sagást. & M.O.Dillon) S.E.Freire, Chemisquy, Anderb. & Urtubey
 Mniodes pulvinata Cuatrec. - Peru (Ancash, Cajamarca, Puno, La Libertad)
 Mniodes radians (Benth.) S.E.Freire, Chemisquy, Anderb. & Urtubey
 Mniodes santanica (Cabrera) S.E.Freire, Chemisquy, Anderb. & Urtubey
 Mniodes schultzii (Wedd.) S.E.Freire, Chemisquy, Anderb. & Urtubey
 Mniodes spathulifolia (Sagást. & M.O.Dillon) M.O.Dillon
 Mniodes subspicata (Wedd.) S.E.Freire, Chemisquy, Anderb. & Urtubey
 Mniodes turneri (Sagást. & M.O.Dillon) M.O.Dillon
 formerly included
 Mniodes tunariensis (Kuntze) Hieron. ex Weberb. - Novenia tunariensis (Kuntze) S.E.Freire

References

 
Asteraceae genera
Flora of South America